Boutel  may refer to:
Bowtell
Mrs. Boutel, actress